Henry Bridges (4 July 1675 – 9 May 1728) was an English Anglican priest.

The son of James Brydges, 8th Baron Chandos, he was educated at Christ Church, Oxford. He was Archdeacon of Rochester from 1720 until his death.

Notes

18th-century English Anglican priests
Archdeacons of Rochester
Alumni of Christ Church, Oxford